World Hijab Day is an annual event founded by Nazma Khan in 2013, taking place on 1 February each year in 140 countries worldwide. Its stated purpose is to encourage women of all religions and backgrounds to wear and experience the hijab for a day and to educate and spread awareness on why hijab is worn. Nazma Khan said her goal was also to normalize hijab wearing.

World Hijab Day has been criticized as spreading the misinformation that the head covering is always worn voluntarily, while women in Iran are forced to wear it. It has been noted that 1 February was also the date Ayatollah Ruhollah Khomeini returned to Iran from his French exile, which subsequently led to the enforcement of mandatory purdah and wearing of hijabs.

Background
Nazma Khan, a Bangladeshi-American, launched World Hijab Day (WHD) in 2013. She said that her aim was "to raise awareness and normalize the wearing of a hijab." Khan added that she launched the day due hoping for "foster[ing] religious tolerance" given experiences of facing "discrimination and bullying in school and university by being spat on, chased, kicked and called a “terrorist”." This way, other women would not have the same experiences as "she had to endure."

Official recognition
In 2017 New York State recognized World Hijab Day, and an event marking the day was hosted at the House of Commons, which was attended by Theresa May (former UK Prime Minister). The House of Representatives of the Philippines approved 1 February as "annual national hijab day" to promote an understanding of the Muslim tradition in 2021.

Receptions
A. J. Caschetta criticizes the event's date of 1 February as ironic and distasteful since it coincides with the return of Ayatollah Ruhollah Khomeini to Iran from his French exile, which subsequently lead to the enforcement of mandatory wearing of hijabs. Caschetta argues that while the hijab is being promoted in the Western world as part of the right to choose clothing, the same right to choice is not being fought for persecuted women who refuse to wear the hijab.   

In February 2013, Maryam Namazie, a vocal ex-Muslim and campaigner, criticized World Hijab Day in a blog post that compared World Hijab Day with a World Female Genital Mutilation Day or a World Child Marriage Day. Asra Nomani wrote an opinion piece in The Washington Post saying the World Hijab Day event spreads the "misleading interpretation" that the head covering is always worn voluntarily, and that "hijab" purely means headscarf. In his own opinion piece published in 2017, Maajid Nawaz references the earlier Nomani & Arafa article and describes the event as "worse than passé", suggesting that the name be changed to "Hijab is a Choice Day".

In 2018, Canadian human-rights campaigner Yasmine Mohammed started a #NoHijabDay campaign in response, to celebrate the  women who have defied social censure and the state to remove the hijab. She said that No Hijab Day is a global day of support for bold women who reject the hijab, those who wish to choose what to wear on their heads.

World Hijab Day coincides with the first day of the annual World Interfaith Harmony Week by the United Nations. On this day, Hijab advocates invite all to "experience the feeling the liberation of submitting oneself completely." Some found "seizing" this first day as World Hijab Day very presumptuous and aggressive, especially when hijab wearers were invited on the 2nd day to "experience the feeling the liberation by taking it off."

Social media 
World Hijab Day and No Hijab Day both are largely influenced through social media. World Hijab Day campaigners promote the day with hashtags such as #EmpoweredinHijab.

See also
Global Pink Hijab Day
International Purple Hijab Day
Islamic feminist views on dress codes
White Wednesdays
Haya Day
International Day To Combat Islamophobia

Bibliography 

 Rahbari, L., Dierickx, S., Coene, G., & Longman, C. (2021). Transnational Solidarity with Which Muslim Women? The Case of the My Stealthy Freedom and World Hijab Day Campaigns. Politics & Gender, 17(1), 112-135. doi:10.1017/S1743923X19000552
 Raihanah, M. M. (2017). "  ‘World Hijab Day’: Positioning the Hijabi in Cyberspace".  In Seen and Unseen. Leiden, The Netherlands: Brill.  doi: https://doi.org/10.1163/9789004357013_007
Rahbari, Ladan (2021), In Her Shoes: Transnational Digital Solidarity With Muslim Women, or the Hijab?. Tijds. voor econ. en Soc. Geog., 112: 107-120. https://doi.org/10.1111/tesg.12376 
Shirazi, Faegheh. 2019. "The Veiling Issue in 20th Century Iran in Fashion and Society, Religion, and Government" Religions 10, no. 8: 461. https://doi.org/10.3390/rel10080461
Oren, Elizabeth. “Culture in a Murky World: Hijab Trends in Jihadi Popular Culture.” The Cyber Defense Review, vol. 3, no. 3, Army Cyber Institute, 2018, pp. 83–92, https://www.jstor.org/stable/26554999
Anouar El Younssi (2018) Maajid Nawaz, Irshad Manji, and the Call for a Muslim Reformation, Politics, Religion & Ideology, 19:3, 305-325, DOI: 10.1080/21567689.2018.1524327
Ghumkhor Sahar . (2020) The Confessional Body. In: The Political Psychology of the Veil. Palgrave Studies in Political Psychology. Palgrave Macmillan, Cham. https://doi.org/10.1007/978-3-030-32061-4_6

References

Purdah
Religious headgear
Scarves
Veils
February observances
International observances
Hijab